Tale of Fairy is a 2018 South Korean television series starring Moon Chae-won, Yoon Hyun-min, Seo Ji-hoon, Jeon Soo-jin and Kang Mi-na. It is based on the popular webtoon of the same title by Dol Bae which was first published via Naver WEBTOON in 2017. The series aired on tvN from November 5 to December 25, 2018.

Cast

Main
 Moon Chae-won as Sun Ok-nam
 Go Doo-shim as old Sun Ok-nam 
 A 699-year old fairy who currently works as a barista with the special ability to talk to plants. Only a few can see her otherworldly beauty while she appears to the majority as a humble old woman.
 Yoon Hyun-min as Jung Yi-hyun / Immortal Izy / Deer
 Yoon So-yi as Immortal Izy
 A biology professor. One of Ok-nam's potential husband reincarnations.
 Seo Ji-hoon as Kim Geum / Immortal Daube / Bausae the woodcutter
 A graduate student and assistant professor at Lee Won University, Department of Biology. Another one of Ok-nam's potential husband reincarnations. He has the ability communicate with animals.
 Jeon Soo-jin as Lee Ham-sook
 A professor of psychology at Lee Won University who also works as a psychiatrist. A close friend to Jung Yi-hyun. She has a one-sided love for him.
 Kang Mi-na as Jeom Soon-yi
 Daughter of Sun Ok-nam who can turn into a cat or a tiger under certain circumstances. A ghostwriter of an erotica.

Supporting

Deities
 Ahn Young-mi as Jo Bong-dae
 A guardian deity who operates the coffee truck at Lee Won University.
 Ahn Gil-kang as Master Gu
 A pigeon deity who'd lost the ability to fly.
 Go Geon-han as Park Shin-seon
 An immortal wizard. 
 Hwang Young-hee as Fairy Oh 
 Im Ha-ryong as King Bukdu

Lee Won University
 Yoo Jung-woo as Eum Kyung-sul
 An aspiring film director. He has a crush on Jeom Soon-yi.
 Yoo Ah-reum as Ahn Jung-min
 A graduate student at the Lee Won University, Department of Biology.
 Ahn Seung-gyun as Oh Kyung-sik
 A graduate student at the Lee Won University, Department of Biology.
 Yum Dong-hun as Professor Park
 Jung Yi-hyun's rival.
 Kang Da-hyun as Prof. Jung's student	
 A student of Jung Yi-hyun's at Lee Won University.

Others
 Yoo In-soo as Prof. Jung's student
 Seo Cho-won as Supporting
 Han Da-hee as Jung Yi-hyun's first love
 Baek Hyun-joo as Kim Geum's mother

Special appearances
 Han Hyun-min as Ethiopian exchange fairy
 Kim Sun-a as Butterfly-haired Eelworm (voice cameo)
 Jung Kyung-ho as Jeum Dol the Egg/Blue Dragon (voice cameo)
 Eric Mun as Alex the Frog (voice cameo)
 Jung Yu-mi as lotus (voice cameo)
 So Hee-jung as Jeong Yi-hyeon's mother

Production
 Kang So-ra was cast in the lead female role but had to back out of the drama due to scheduling conflicts.
 The first script reading was held on May 27, 2018.

Original soundtrack

Part 1

Part 2

Part 3

Part 4

Ratings

References

External links
  
 Tale of Fairy at Studio Dragon 
 Tale of Fairy at JS Pictures 
 
 

Korean-language television shows
TVN (South Korean TV channel) television dramas
2018 South Korean television series debuts
2018 South Korean television series endings
South Korean romantic fantasy television series
Television shows based on South Korean webtoons
Television series by Studio Dragon
Television series by JS Pictures